Lon Ethan Bender (born July 22, 1959) is an American supervising sound editor, business executive and inventor. Bender won the Academy Award for Best Sound Effects Editing for his work on Braveheart (1995). He has been recognized for numerous other industry awards as well, including Oscar nominations for The Revenant (2015), Drive (2011) and Blood Diamond (2006). Bender is the co-founder of post production sound services company Soundelux.

While Bender is primarily known for his work on feature films, Bender has also provided sound design for a variety of commercials, created sonic branding for major corporations, and created the soundscape for Disney's Broadway production of Tarzan.

Bender is also an inventor and founder of several early-stage ventures, including companies that develop devices designed to assist individuals living with the effects of hearing loss.

A cycling enthusiast and a competitive race car driver, Bender resides in the Los Angeles area.

Early life
Bender grew up in North Hollywood, California.  He attended the Oakwood School, known for its progressive educational approach of process over product.  While at the school, Bender was very engaged in the theater arts program, both as an actor and handling sound for many school productions. His cycling career began as a member of The North Hollywood Wheelman and raced in the mid 1970s, scoring 18 wins in 22 races in 1973.  Growing up in the San Fernando Valley, Bender developed a childhood fascination with Drag Racing, which led to his purchasing his first car, a 1953 Austin Healey, in which he began his auto racing career. He won the 1985 Southern California E Production championship and went on to compete for many seasons in the IMSA Firestone Firehawk Endurance series. His greatest result was finishing second in the Camel GT Lights Prototype class at the 1992 24 Hours of Daytona.

Career
In 1982, Bender teamed with Wylie Stateman to form Soundelux Entertainment Group. Bender and Statement explored numerous production, post-production and manufacturing opportunities.  The company's audio publishing division created more than 100 books on tape.  Later, a theme park systems and software unit was created, which would eventually rival Disney's Imagineering.  The company produced and installed audio/video delivery and control systems to clients worldwide.

In 1995, Bender gained industry-wide recognition for his work as a supervising sound editor, receiving an Academy Award, and a British Academy Award for his efforts on Braveheart.

In 2000 Soundelux Entertainment group was acquired by Liberty Media.  The SEG post sound entities were combined with those of ToddAO to form Ascent Media's Creative Sound Services Group. From 2000 through 2005 Bender served as its President, overseeing the integration and modernization of its facilities and integration of its administrative and creative staff.

In 2006, Bender returned exclusively to his creative roots, which started with the creation of a fully cinematic soundscape for the Broadway production of Tarzan, which is still running, currently in Hamburg, Germany.

Since then has been nominated for three Academy Awards for his work on Blood Diamond, Drive and The Revenant.  Bender has embraced a workflow that blends Sound Design and Supervision with the sound mixing process in order to expand his creative team's effectiveness.

Innovations

Advanced Data Encoding System (ADE)
In 1994, Bender received an Academy Award for Scientific/Technical Achievement for the development of the Advanced Data Encoding System (ADE), a technology designed to bridge the gap between linear film editing and non-linear sound editing. ADE represented a significant leap ahead in post-production. The system created a computerized edit decision list from the picture editor's workprint, which reduced the time and effort required to find the right sound take for the picture.  Prior to ADE, sound editors would laboriously match a specific take of dialogue with the picture using a film code number and a code book containing the sound roll, scene and take number.  The ADE matched an Apple computer with a modified audio film stock, which carried the traditional dialogue and sound magnetic stripe, plus a narrower stripe loaded with a SMPTE time code — the industry standard for tracking film or sound — and computer data.

Digital Foley System (DFS)
The Digital Foley System was conceived by Bender in 2002 as a result of his long-standing interest in expanding the art of Foley recording.  The DFS system accepts input from the Foley Artist in the form of MIDI triggers, generated using pressure-sensitive foot controllers, integrating industry standard audio post-production tools with a custom software interface.  This interface is one of two elements pivotal to the successful implementation of the device.  The other element is an extensive sound library, recorded on a Foley stage with multiple shoe types and surfaces.

In development for two years, the DFS product was deployed for feature film work in 2004, first utilized on the feature films Johnson Family Vacation and Chronicles of Riddick.  In 2006, the DFS product was used as part of the Academy Award-nominated sound editing work on Blood Diamond.

VocalStream
In 2007, Bender, along with Wylie Stateman, launched VocalStream, a technology solution for online delivery of customized content, which, when used in conjunction with AudioBlast, a client-branded Adobe Flash-based player, creates a delivery platform for multimedia content to web users.

Notable Credits
2016
 Nocturnal Animals
 The Revenant

2015
 The Monk
 Netflix Sonic Signature

2014
 Pawn Sacrifice
 Lamborghini Huracán Project
 Winter's Tale

2013
 August: Osage County
 2 Guns

2012
 The Hunger Games
 Drive

2008
 Defiance
 The Tale of Despereaux

2007
 The Bucket List

2006
 Blood Diamond

2004
 King Arthur
 The Butterfly Effect

2002
 We Were Soldiers

2001
 Shrek

2000
 Mission to Mars

1999
 Inspector Gadget

1998
 The Prince of Egypt
 Mulan

1996
 The Hunchback of Notre Dame

1995
 Pocahontas
 Braveheart

1994
 Legends of the Fall

1991
 L.A. Story

1989
 Glory

1987
 Planes, Trains & Automobiles
 The Princess Bride

1986
 Ferris Bueller's Day Off
 Stand By Me

Notable Industry Recognition

Videos
Bender on his Academy Award-nominated work on Drive

Bender on his work on The Hunger Games

References

External links
 
 The New York Times: The Carpetbagger blog Below the Line: The Sounds of ‘Drive’

1959 births
Living people
American sound editors
Place of birth missing (living people)
Best Sound Editing Academy Award winners
Best Sound BAFTA Award winners